Ô-de-Selle is a commune in the Somme department in Hauts-de-France in northern France. It was established on 1 January 2019 by merger of the former communes of Lœuilly (the seat), Neuville-lès-Lœuilly and Tilloy-lès-Conty.

See also
Communes of the Somme department

References

Communes of Somme (department)
Communes nouvelles of Somme
Populated places established in 2019
2019 establishments in France